The first season of Harry's Law, a legal dramedy created by David E. Kelley, premiered on January 17, 2011, and concluded on April 4, 2011. The season consisted of twelve hour-long episodes that aired Monday nights at 10pm on NBC. The series stars Kathy Bates as Harriett Korn, a patent lawyer who is fired from her firm when she is caught smoking cannabis in her office. She subsequently starts her own small firm in a storefront that used to be a shoe store where she defends clients charged with serious crimes.

Despite mixed reaction from critics, the series became NBC's highest rated scripted drama and was renewed for a second season, which premiered Wednesday, September 21.

Cast

Main cast 
 Kathy Bates as Harriett "Harry" Korn
 Aml Ameen as Malcolm Davies
 Brittany Snow as Jenna Backstrom
 Nathan Corddry as Adam Branch

Recurring cast 
 Christopher McDonald as Thomas "Tommy" Jefferson
 Johnny Ray Gill as Damien Winslow
 Jordana Spiro as Rachael Miller
 Paul McCrane as Josh "Puck" Peyton
 Irene Keng as Chunhua Lao
 Rashad Hood as Lewis Epps
 Camryn Manheim as Kim Mendelsohn

Episodes

Reception 
Season 1 earned a 48 out of 100 of Metacritic, a site that assigns scores to shows based on reviews. Most reviews of the pilot were mixed. In a positive one Rob Owen said it had crisp politically tinged dialogue.
The pilot was seen by 11.07 million viewers in the US. The show retained most of those viewers throughout its run, making it NBC's highest rated drama.

References

External links 

2011 American television seasons